Aumetz is a commune in the Moselle department in Grand Est in northeastern France.

Population

See also
 Communes of the Moselle department

References

External links
 

Communes of Moselle (department)